Mirage Retail Group (formerly Blokker Holding) is a Dutch company that owns several chains of stores.

Blokker Holding is active in twelve countries and in 2010 all the chains combined had 2825 stores. In 2015 the company had a revenue of 2.1 billion euro, of which 98 million euros from online retail. Most store chains have both stores they own and stores that are franchised to other investors.

Blokker Holding has not entered the stock exchange. In 2019, the Blokker Family sold the holding company to Michiel Witteveen. Witteveen became the CEO and sold the less profitable chains.

Companies 
The following companies are part of Blokker Holding:

Former formulas:

Blokker Holding also operated:
 Giraffe
 Groenblok
 Holland Handels Huis
 Hoyng
 Gifts and Dreams
 Tuincentrum Overvecht
 E-Plaza

References

External links 
Official website

Retail companies of the Netherlands
Retail companies established in 1896
Multinational companies headquartered in the Netherlands